St. Val's Mystery is a 1945 black and white French comedy film starring Fernandel directed by René Le Hénaff,  Shot during the winter of 1944-1945 in the studios of Boulogne, this was the Fernandel's first film following the liberation of Paris.

The film's original release title is Le mystère Saint-Val, and it was released in the United States in 1945 under the English title of St. Val's Mystery. It was then released in Denmark on October 23, 1950 as Det mystiske slot and in Portugal on June 1, 1954 as Fernandel, Polícia Amador.

Plot
An insurance-office clerk Désiré Le Sec (Fernandel) dreams of being a great detective. The clerk's uncle (Marcel Carpentier) is his boss at that agency, and sends Désiré out on a frivolous mission to Saint-Val Castle, where the master of places has been found dead through mysterious circumstances.  Désiré uncovers a real life murder and becomes mixed up with the murder case, ending up spending a night in the forbidding and spooky old Saint-Val castle.

Cast

 Fernandel as Désiré Le Sec
 Jean Davy as Max Robertal
 Marcel Carpentier as L'oncle de Désiré
 Marcel Pérès as Le brigadier
 Erno Crisa as Le vagabond 
 Jean Dasté as L'huissier
 Alexandre Rignault as Antoine
 Pierre Renoir as Dartignac
 Paul Demange
 Viviane Gosset as Suzy
 Arlette Guttinguer as Rose
 Germaine Kerjean as Madame De Saint-Val		
 Maxime Fabert

Reception
The film was a big hit in France, recording admissions of 2,397,153.

James Travers of Film de France offered that the film appears to have borrowed its plot from Ten Little Indians but with a  "decidedly unfunny comic twist".  When seen with the now-removed musical numbers it contained in its original release, the film "was probably more digestible". Summarizing, Travers felt the gags were predictable, the plot "hackneyed and pedestrian", and the "unimaginative pay-off definitely does not reward" the viewer., concluding that this marked the film as "clearly not Fernandel's finest hour".

References

External links

St Val's Mystery at Films de France

French comedy films
1945 comedy films
1945 films
French black-and-white films
1940s French-language films
Films directed by René Le Hénaff
1940s French films